Mount Dhëmbel is a mountain in southern Albania in the geographical region of Southern Mountain Range. It is part of the mountain chain Trebeshinë-Dhëmbel-Nemërçkë which goes parallel to the Shëndelli-Lunxhëri-Bureto chain.

References

Mountains of Albania